Hollywood High is a 1977 American sex comedy film. The film is generally regarded as being of very low quality, with one retrospective review calling it "a shockingly inept piece of teen sexploitation" and remarking, "Even for a dubious genre like this, this movie reaches a level of badness that would make even the most jaded exploitation filmmakers pause, and subsequently resolve never to reach such a low point. Practically every department in this movie - acting, writing, directing, etc. - is at the very bottom of the barrel." Despite its poor reception, the movie had an unofficial sequel, Hollywood High Part 2, in 1981, which was likewise panned.

Unrelated series pilot
Turner Classic Movies notes the existence of an unrelated 30-minute television pilot, also debuting in 1977, for a prospective series.

Notes

External links
 
 Hollywood High Part 2 at Internet Movie Database

Films set in Los Angeles
1977 films
American sex comedy films
1970s English-language films
1970s sex comedy films
American teen comedy films
1970s high school films
1977 comedy films
1970s American films